Kvitbreen (White Glacier) is a glacier in Ny-Friesland at Spitsbergen, Svalbard. It located south of Newtontoppen, and is connected with the glacier of Veteranen at the other side of Trebrepasset.

References

Glaciers of Spitsbergen